The Buchans Miners were a senior ice hockey team based in Buchans, Newfoundland and Labrador and were a member of the Newfoundland Senior Hockey League.
The Miners were awarded the Herder Memorial Trophy seven times as all-Newfoundland senior hockey champions, including three consecutive championships from 1950 to 1952. The club folded in 1970 but came back for one season in the late seventies.

History
The Buchans Miners had its roots in picked teams from the local senior hockey league. Picked teams from Buchans began intertown play as early as 1929 after an ore shed was converted to a rink by the Buchans Mining Company.
In 1948, Buchans was the first Newfoundland senior hockey team to hire paid hockey players to improve their roster. These first imports were from Kirkland Lake, Ontario.

The Miners won three straight Herder Championships from 1950 to 1952, again in 1954 and the final championship in 1963.

When the ASARCO Mining Company ended its support after the 1968–69 season, the Miners withdrew from the Newfoundland Senior Hockey League. The Miners reformed for one more season in 1977–78.

Seasons and records

Season-by-season results

Note: GP = Games played, W = Wins, L = Losses, T = Ties, OTL = Overtime Losses, Pts = Points, GF = Goals for, GA = Goals against, DNQ = Did not qualify

NAHA, Sr. = Newfoundland Amateur Hockey Association senior division, NAHA, Sr. A = Newfoundland Amateur Hockey Association senior Section A, NSHL = Newfoundland Senior Hockey League (1962-1989)
|}

Note: There were no regular season games from 1947 through 1962. Teams played exhibition games, followed by division playoffs and the Herder playoffs.

Leaders

Captains
Phil "Scotty" MacPhail
Bill Scott
Hugh Wadden

Head coaches
Frank Bowman
Hugh Wadden

Trophies and awards

Team awards
Five all-Newfoundland senior hockey championships (Herder Memorial Trophy): 1950, 1951, 1952, 1954, 1963

Individual awards

Honoured Members

Retired Numbers

NL Hockey Hall of Fame
The following people who were members of the Miners have been inducted into the Newfoundland and Labrador Hockey Hall of Fame.
Note: the year of induction into NLHHOF is noted
T A Gus Soper (1995)
William (Bill) Scott (1995)
Hugh Wadden (1995)
Frank Walker (1996)
James Hornell, Sr (2012)

References

Bibliography

Ice hockey in Newfoundland and Labrador
Defunct Ice hockey teams in Newfoundland and Labrador